Tekii Lazaro (28 May 1954 – 8 August 2020) was a Cook Islands politician and Member of the Cook Islands Parliament.  He was a member of the Cook Islands Party.

Lazaro was educated at Niua school and Aitutaki High school, and studied to be a meteorologist in Fiji and New Zealand.  He served for 35 years in the Cook Islands Police as a Meteorological Officer.  He stood in the seat of Pukapuka–Nassau in the 2010 election, and narrowly won the seat on the night.  A subsequent election petition found him guilty of bribery, and declared his election void.  Lazaro contested and won the subsequent by-election.

In 2012 the Taxi Association complained that Lazaro was picking up tourists in an unlicensed taxi van. He was told to get an appropriate licence.

He was re-elected in the 2014 election, and appointed Associate Minister of Finance. He retired at the 2018 election and did not contest the seat.

References

1954 births
2020 deaths
Members of the Parliament of the Cook Islands
Cook Island Māori people
Cook Islands Party politicians
Cook Island police officers